408 (Fleet Fighter) Flight was a naval aviation unit of the Royal Air Force operating during the early 1930s.

Early history

408 (Fleet Fighter) Flight was formed on 30 March 1929 at RNAS Donibristle.

The following aircraft were known to be used by this flight:
 Fairey Flycatcher S1293 19 
 Hawker Nimrod S1585 576.

Disbandment

The unit was disbanded and merged with 409 (Fleet Fighter) Flight aboard  on 3 April 1933, both units becoming 802 Naval Air Squadron.

References

Citations

Bibliography

Military units and formations established in 1929